Johann Sebastian Bach composed the church cantata  (Wretched man that I am, who shall deliver me), 48, in Leipzig for the 19th Sunday after Trinity and first performed it on 3 October 1723.

History and words 
Bach wrote the cantata in 1723 for the 19th Sunday after Trinity as part of his first cantata cycle. The prescribed readings for the Sunday were from Paul's Epistle to the Ephesians, "put on the new man, which after God is created", and from the Gospel of Matthew, Healing the paralytic at Capernaum. The first movement is written on words from Romans 7:24, stressing the need of the sinner for redemption.

Bach first performed the cantata on 3 October 1723.

Scoring and structure 
The cantata is structured in seven movements, and scored for alto and tenor soloists, a four-part choir, and a Baroque instrumental ensemble of trumpet, two oboes, two violins, viola, and basso continuo.

 Chorus: 
 Recitative (alto): 
 Chorale: 
 Aria (alto): 
 Recitative (tenor): 
 Aria (tenor): 
 Chorale:

Music 
An instrumental chorale melody is present in the opening chorus. It may refer to the words "", but also creates a connection to the closing chorale, which was sung on the same tune, and therefore may also quote its first verse. This chorale  is played by the trumpet in canon with the oboes. The strings present themes in the instrumental introduction which are later used as a countersubject to the lamentative theme of the voices.

A recitative of the alto, accompanied by the strings, leads to a chorale, concluding the ideas of the first section in expressive harmonization.

A different mood prevails in the following aria, the voice and the oboe being equal partners in the request to spare the soul. In the last aria the tenor is accompanied by the strings with oboe, music dominated by a lilting rhythm changing between  time and  time.

Recordings 
 Die Bach Kantate Vol. 51, Helmuth Rilling, Gächinger Kantorei, Bach-Collegium Stuttgart, Marga Höffgen, Aldo Baldin, Hänssler 1973
 J. S. Bach: Das Kantatenwerk – Sacred Cantatas Vol. 5, Nikolaus Harnoncourt, Vienna Boys Choir, Concentus Musicus Wien, Paul Esswood, Kurt Equiluz, Teldec 1974
 J. S. Bach: Complete Cantatas Vol. 9, Ton Koopman, Amsterdam Baroque Orchestra & Choir, Bernhard Landauer, Christoph Prégardien, Antoine Marchand 1998
 Bach Cantatas Vol. 10, John Eliot Gardiner, Monteverdi Choir, English Baroque Soloists, William Towers, James Gilchrist, Soli Deo Gloria 2000
 Bach: Wie schön leuchtet der Morgenstern – Cantata BWV 1, 48, 78 & 140, Karl-Friedrich Beringer, Windsbacher Knabenchor, Deutsche Kammer-Virtuosen Berlin, Sibylla Rubens, Rebecca Martin, Markus Schäfer, Klaus Mertens, Sony Music 2011
 J. S. Bach: Ich elender Mensch – Leipzig Cantatas, Philippe Herreweghe, Collegium Vocale Gent, Dorothee Mields, Damien Guillon, Thomas Hobbs, Peter Kooy, Phi 2014

References

Sources 
 Ich elender Mensch, wer wird mich erlösen, BWV 48: performance by the Netherlands Bach Society (video and background information)
 
 Ich elender Mensch, wer wird mich erlösen BWV 48; BC A 144 / Sacred cantata (19th Sunday after Trinity) Bach Digital
 Cantata BWV 48 Ich elender Mensch, wer wird mich erlösen history, scoring, sources for text and music, translations to various languages, discography, discussion, Bach Cantatas Website
 BWV 48 Ich elender Mensch, wer wird mich erlösen English translation, University of Vermont
 BWV 48 Ich elender Mensch, wer wird mich erlösen text, scoring, University of Alberta
 Chapter 21 Bwv 48 – The Cantatas of Johann Sebastian Bach Julian Mincham, 2010
 Luke Dahn: BWV 48.7 bach-chorales.com

Church cantatas by Johann Sebastian Bach
1723 compositions
Psalm-related compositions by Johann Sebastian Bach